Flash is the debut studio album by Japanese pop duo Amoyamo. The album peaked at #30 on the Oricon albums chart.

Track listing

Personnel
 Amo – Vocals
 Ayamo – Vocals
 Tomoko Kawase – Production, Lyrics

References

External links
 AMOYAMO official website Somy Music Japan

2013 albums